UniSat-6 is an Italian micro-satellite developed by GAUSS Srl and launched in 2014. The satellite is built in a 0.4x0.4x0.4m box-shaped bus, optimized for piggy-back launch. All instruments are powered by solar cells mounted on the spacecraft body, with maximal electrical power of 11W. The satellite has no on-orbit propulsion; it makes use of an attitude stabilization system based on permanent magnets.

Launch
UniSat-6 was launched from Dombarovsky (air base) site 13, Russia, on 19 June 2014 by a Dnepr rocket.

Mission
The satellite is intended primarily for technology verification in space, the main test piece being 3 deployment systems loaded with 4 CubeSat satellites, namely AeroCube 6, Lemur 1, ANTELSAT and Tigrisat, with a total volume 9U. All sub-satellites were deployed 25 hours after achieving orbit, without incidents.

The satellite is also equipped with an on-board camera to take pictures of the release of the cubesats and for Earth Observation.

See also

 2014 in spaceflight

References

External links

Student satellites
Satellites of Italy
Spacecraft launched in 2014
2014 in Italy
CubeSats
Spacecraft launched by Dnepr rockets